Agrippina Petrovna Volkonskaia (d. 1732), was a Russian courtier. She was the Ober-Hofmeisterin of Catherine I of Russia. She was known for her participation in many political intrigues at court. In 1727, she was the leading figure of a circle of prominent people in a conspiracy with the purpose of bringing about the downfall of Alexander Danilovich Menshikov, but she failed and was exiled.

References 
 Н.И. Павленко. Пётр Андреевич Толстой // Птенцы гнезда Петрова. — М: Мысль, 1985. — С. 207—208. — 332 с.

17th-century births
1732 deaths
Ladies-in-waiting from the Russian Empire